Beaver Airport  is a state-owned, public-use airport located in the village of Beaver in the Yukon-Koyukuk Census Area of the U.S. state of Alaska.

Facilities and aircraft 
For the 12-month period ending December 31, 2005, the airport had 800 aircraft operations, an average of 67 per month: 75% general aviation and 25% air taxi.

Airlines and destinations

Statistics

References

External links 
 FAA Alaska airport diagram (GIF)
 

Airports in the Yukon–Koyukuk Census Area, Alaska